Lavinia Longhi (born 18 March 1980) is an Italian actress. She was born in Mariano Comense, to an Italian father and a Montenegrin mother. She appeared in more than twenty films since 2005.

Selected filmography

References

External links 

1980 births
Living people
Italian film actresses
Italian people of Montenegrin descent